The men's 3000 metres steeplechase at the 1971 European Athletics Championships was held in Helsinki, Finland, at Helsinki Olympic Stadium on 13 and 15 August 1971.

Medalists

Results

Final
15 August

Heats
13 August

Heat 1

Heat 2

Heat 3

Participation
According to an unofficial count, 33 athletes from 18 countries participated in the event.

 (1)
 (2)
 (1)
 (1)
 (3)
 (3)
 (1)
 (2)
 (3)
 (3)
 (1)
 (1)
 (3)
 (1)
 (2)
 (2)
 (2)
 (1)

References

3000 metres steeplechase
Steeplechase at the European Athletics Championships